Narciso Chicho Delgado Elvira (29 October 1967 – 28 January 2020) was a Mexican professional baseball pitcher. 

Elvira was purchased by the Milwaukee Brewers from the Mexican League in 1986. He played his first year in 1987 with the Class A Beloit Brewers of the Midwest League, Class A Stockton Ports of the California League in 1988, split time with Triple A El Paso Diablos of the Texas League and returning to Class A ball with the Ports in 1989. 

He played with the team at the Major League level in 1990 for four games in 5 innings and spent the rest of year in the minors with the Diablos and Beloit Brewers. 

Elvira never returned to MLB after 1990 and spent time with Triple A Denver Zephyrs of the American Association in 1991, Triple A Oklahoma City 89ers of the Pacific Coast League (PCL) in 1992. After a long absence he returned with the then Dodgers Triple A affiliate Albuquerque Dukes of the PCL from 1996 to 1997 and after a brief absence again left for Japan to play professional baseball with the Osaka Kintetsu Buffaloes of the then Japan Pacific League from 2000 to 2001. From 2002 to 2003 he split his time between Samsung Lions of professional Korea Baseball Organization and Campeche Piratas of the Mexican League. He remained with the Piratas from 2004 to 2006. After his third break from baseball he returned in 2009 to play in the Mexican League for Petroleros de Minatitlan before retiring from playing.

While playing for the Buffaloes, Elvira pitched a no-hitter on 20 June 2000.  He is the only Mexican to do so in the Nippon Professional Baseball League.

Elvira and his son were shot and killed on 28 January 2020 in Veracruz.

References

1967 births
2020 deaths
Baseball players from Veracruz
Deaths by firearm in Mexico
Major League Baseball pitchers
Major League Baseball players from Mexico
Male murder victims
Milwaukee Brewers players
Mexican expatriate baseball players in Japan
Mexican expatriate baseball players in South Korea
Mexican expatriate baseball players in the United States
Albuquerque Dukes players
Denver Zephyrs players
Oklahoma City 89ers players
El Paso Diablos players
Milwaukee Brewers minor league affiliates
Los Angeles Dodgers minor league affiliates
Samsung Lions players
Piratas de Campeche players
Petroleros de Minatitlán players
Beloit Brewers players
Stockton Ports players
Osaka Kintetsu Buffaloes players
People murdered in Mexico